Sammi may refer to:
 Sammi (TV series), a 2017 Pakistani drama serial
 Sammi (dance), a dance of Punjab
 Sammi (album), a 1990 album by Sammi Cheng

Given name

 Sammi Awuku (born 1984), Ghanaian politician
 Sammi Adjei (born 1973), Ghanaian football player
 Sammi Cheng (born 1972), Hong Kong singer
 Sammi Cheung (born 1987), Hong Kong actress
 Sammi Davis (born 1964), English actress
 Sammi Fajarowicz (born 1908-1940), German chess master
 Sammi Giancola (born 1987), American television personality
 Sammi Hanratty (born 1995), American actress
 Sammi Kao (born 1969), Taiwanese singer
 Sammi Kane Kraft (born 1992-2012), American actress
 Sammi Rotibi, American-Nigerian film actor
 Sammi Sanchez (born 1998), Mexican-American singer
 Sammi Smith (born 1943-2005), American singer

See also
 Sami (disambiguation)
 Sammie (name)